Colobothea obconica is a species of beetle in the family Cerambycidae. It was described by Per Olof Christopher Aurivillius in 1902 and is known from French Guiana.

References

obconica
Beetles described in 1902